My Sister in Law is an Italian commedia sexy all'italiana directed by Lucio Fulci and starring Edwige Fenech.

Plot 
Viola Orlando, a magistrate of a little town in Veneto, is inflexible and severe. Sworn enemies of the magistrate discover that her twin sister, Rosa, is a prostitute, so they try to get her to visit their city in an attempt to embarrass Viola. However, they wind up getting prosecuted, and Viola, with her head held high, gives up her robes and marries the man she loves.

Cast
 Edwige Fenech as Judge Viola Orlando and Rosa Orlando
 Raf Luca as Raffaele Esposito
 Giancarlo Dettori as Count Renato Altero
 Mario Maranzana as Bortolon
 Carlo Sposito as the Prosecutor
 Walter Valdi as Zaganella
 Gianni Agus as Angelo Scotti
 Oreste Lionello as Francesco Lo Presti
 Lucio Fulci as the second gas station attendant

Production
Producer Roberto Barigia stated that the film was made "out of the need to make a film starring Fenech, who at that time was a box-office star. Alas, we made it at the wrong time, as when we decided to try our hand at the genre Fenech's moment had already passed and her name was not so much of an asset as before."

La Pretora found director Lucio Fulci working with an irregular group of collaborators with only assistant director Roberto Giandalia who would go on to work as Fulci for nearly all of Fulci's films concluding with Murder Rock and editor Orenalla Micheli, the rest of the crew are not his regular collaborators. The film's screenplay was by husband-and-wife writing team Franco Marotta and Laura Toscano.

Release
My Sister in Law was released on 5 November 1976. It was not released in English-language theatres. According to Troy Howarth, a release in the United Kingdom was given the title My Sister in Law.

References

Sources

External links

Films directed by Lucio Fulci
Commedia sexy all'italiana
Films scored by Nico Fidenco
1970s Italian films